Vendeuvre is a commune of the Calvados department, in France.

Vendeuvre may also refer to:
 Château de Vendeuvre, a château in that commune
 Vendeuvre-du-Poitou, Vienne
 Vendeuvre-sur-Barse, Aube

See also 
 Vandœuvre (disambiguation)
 Vandœuvres, Switzerland
 Vendœuvres, Indre, France